Waiting list, Waiting List or similar terms may refer to:

 Waiting List Service, for Internet domain name registrations
 Wait list, in United States university and college admissions
 Waiting list ticket, a Reservation against Cancellation ticket for travel on Indian Railways
 Waiting List, alternate name of the 2000 Cuban film Lista de Espera

See also
 Waiting period